Richard Glen Cunningham (born March 3, 1951) is a Canadian former professional ice hockey defenceman who played 323 games in the World Hockey Association (WHA).

Early life 
Cunningham was born in Toronto. As a youth, he played in the 1963 Quebec International Pee-Wee Hockey Tournament with the Toronto Shopsy's minor ice hockey team.

Career 
During his career, Cunningham played for the Ottawa Nationals, Toronto Toros, and Birmingham Bulls in the WHA. In 1977, he moved to Austria and subsequently played for the Austria men's national ice hockey team.

References

External links

1951 births
Living people
Austrian ice hockey players
Birmingham Bulls players
Buffalo Norsemen players
Canadian ice hockey defencemen
Ottawa Nationals players
Peterborough Petes (ice hockey) players
Toronto Maple Leafs draft picks
Toronto Toros players
Ice hockey people from Toronto
Ice hockey players at the 1984 Winter Olympics
Olympic ice hockey players of Austria